Frau Margot is an opera in 3 acts by composer Thomas Pasatieri. The work uses an English language libretto by Frank Corsaro which is based on Corsaro's play Lyric Suite. The opera's premiere was presented by the Fort Worth Opera on June 2, 2007. Corsaro directed the production which used sets by Alison Nalder and costumes by Steven Bryant. A recording of this production was released on CD by Albany Records.

Roles

References

2007 operas
English-language operas
Operas
Operas by Thomas Pasatieri
Operas based on plays